Lynn Seidemann (born November 19, 1963) is a former American wheelchair tennis player and dressage rider. She became a paraplegic after a skiing accident in 1983.

References

1963 births
Living people
People from Coppell, Texas
Paralympic equestrians of the United States
American female equestrians
American dressage riders
Paralympic wheelchair tennis players of the United States
Wheelchair tennis players at the 1992 Summer Paralympics
Equestrians at the 2000 Summer Paralympics
Equestrians at the 2004 Summer Paralympics
Equestrians at the 2008 Summer Paralympics
Medalists at the 1992 Summer Paralympics
Medalists at the 2004 Summer Paralympics
Paralympic medalists in wheelchair tennis
Paralympic silver medalists for the United States
People with paraplegia
21st-century American women